During the 1974–75 English football season, Leicester City F.C. competed in the Football League First Division.

Season summary
In the 1974–75 season, Leicester could not improve on last season's 9th place, finishing 9 places lower. Goalkeeper Peter Shilton refused to sign a new contract and followed his mentor Gordon Banks by signing for Stoke City at a record fee for a goalkeeper of £325,000 in November and resulted in Mark Wallington starting the season in goal. From early November to late February, the Foxes did not register a league win in 13 games which saw them slip to bottom of the table and heading for relegation but again their FA Cup progress gave them a boost in their league form. As the season drew to a close, Chris Garland improved their strike force by scoring 8 goals in 10 matches, which was enough to save the Foxes from the drop in 18th and 3 points clear of relegation.

Final league table

Results
Leicester City's score comes first

Legend

Football League First Division

FA Cup

League Cup

Squad

References

Leicester City F.C. seasons
Leicester City